Massue is a surname. Notable people with the surname include:
 Aignan-Aimé Massue (1781–1866), seigneur and political figure in Lower Canada
 Louis Massue (1786–1869), businessman and political figure in Canada East
 Joseph-Aimé Massue (1860–1891), seigneur and political figure in Quebec
 Louis Huet Massue (1828–1891), farmer, seigneur, and political figure in Quebec
 Melville Henry Massue (1868–1921), British genealogist and author